Marie-Frédérique Ayissi (born January 11, 1982 in Vaulx-en-Velin, France) is a French basketball player who plays for club Union Hainaut of the Ligue Féminine de Basketball..

References

External links
 www.basketlfb.com

French women's basketball players
1982 births
Living people
21st-century French women